"The District Sleeps Alone Tonight" is a song by the electronic music band The Postal Service, the second single from their debut album, Give Up, released July 8, 2003 on Sub Pop Records. The single included a cover of "Suddenly Everything Has Changed" by The Flaming Lips, and two remixed tracks.

Background
The song was written by Ben Gibbard and Jimmy Tamborello, and recorded in early 2002. The "District" in the song's title is a reference to Washington, D.C. (known colloquially as "The District" by its inhabitants) where Gibbard's girlfriend at the time had moved. The cover artwork for the single was designed by Kozyndan.

In 2004, this song was featured in the soundtrack of 2004 film D.E.B.S.

In 2019, this song was featured in the first episode of Hulu limited series Looking for Alaska.

Cover versions
 Allred covered this song on their 2008 album "Covers"
Sharif covered this song on his 2009 record "Kisses and Lies."
 Rich O'Toole covers this song on his 2008 CD In a Minute or 2.
 Jonna Lee covers this as the b-side on her 2007 single Dried Out Eyes, calling it DC Sleeps Alone Tonight.
 Ben Marwood covers the song on his 2011 album "Outside There's A Curse".
 The Hampdens covered the song on their album "The Last Party".
 In 2011, English musician Birdy covered the song in her debut studio album Birdy, which released on November 4.
 Frank Turner covered the song on his 2008 compilation album "The First Three Years"

Track listing
"The District Sleeps Alone Tonight"  – 4:44
"The District Sleeps Alone Tonight" (remix by DJ Downfall)  – 6:55
"Such Great Heights" (remix by John Tejada)  – 5:49
"Suddenly Everything Has Changed" (The Flaming Lips cover)  – 3:52

References

External links
Interview with Jimmy Tamborello about "The District Sleeps Alone Tonight" on the podcast Song Exploder, January 1, 2014

The Postal Service songs
2003 singles
Sub Pop singles
2002 songs
Songs written by Ben Gibbard
Songs written by Dntel